Good People may refer to:

 Good People (film), a 2014 American film
 Good People (play), a 2011 play by David Lindsay-Abaire
 "Good People" (song), by Jack Johnson
 "Good People", by Bliss n Eso featuring Kasey Chambers, 2021
 "Good People", by Audio Adrenaline from Bloom, 1995
 A euphemistic name for fairies

See also
 The Good People, a 2016 novel by Hannah Kent